Božetěch is a Czech surname turned first name. The Slovak version is Božetech. The name can refer to several people in particular:

Božetěch, a medieval monk, sculptor
Emilián Božetěch Glocar
Jozef Božetech Klemens